Hanumangarh Town railway station is a small railway station in Hanumangarh district, [Rajasthan]. Its code is HMO. It serves Hanumangarh city. The station consists of two platforms. The platforms are not well sheltered. It lacks many facilities including water and sanitation. Hanumangarh Town is one of two railway stations in the city of Hanumangarh.

References

Railway junction stations in India
Railway stations in Hanumangarh district
Bikaner railway division